Sannantha bidwillii is a species in the myrtle family, Myrtaceae. It is endemic to Queensland in Australia. The species was first formally described in 1997 and given the name Babingtonia bidwillii. In 2007 it was placed in the newly created genus Sannantha. For many years the name Baeckea virgata was misapplied to this species. Baeckea virgata, currently Sannantha virgata, is endemic to New Caledonia.

Cultivation
The species has been cultivated for a number of years under various names.
Cultivars include:
'Howie's Sweet Midget'

References

Flora of Queensland
bidwillii
Myrtales of Australia